Zendesk, Inc. is an American company headquartered in San Francisco, California. It provides software-as-a-service products related to customer support, sales, and other customer communications. The company was founded in Copenhagen, Denmark, in 2007. Zendesk raised about $86 million in venture capital investments before going public in 2014.

On November 22, 2022, Zendesk announced that it had been acquired by a group of investors led by Hellman & Friedman and Permira for approximately $10.2 billion.

History

Origins and funding 
Zendesk was founded in Copenhagen, Denmark in 2007 by three friends: Morten Primdahl, Alexander Aghassipour, and Mikkel Svane. The founders started developing the Zendesk software in Svane's loft. Initially, Zendesk was funded by the cofounders with each doing consulting jobs to support their families. Within a couple months of the Zendesk software-as-a-service product being released in the fall of 2007, it had about 1,000 trial customers. Initially, interest in the software spread slowly through word-of-mouth predominantly among other startups. Adoption accelerated in 2008, due to an increased interest in responding to customer complaints on social media and after Twitter started using Zendesk.

Venture capital investors were willing to invest in Zendesk only if the company moved to the United States, where most of their customers were. In 2009 Zendesk moved to Boston, Massachusetts. About six months later, they made a second move, this time to San Francisco, California. The company raised $500,000 in seed funding, which was followed by a series A funding round for an undisclosed amount and a series B round for $6 million. Zendesk raised $19 million in a series C funding round in December 2010, followed by $60 million in a series D funding round in 2012. This brought total venture capital funding to about $86 million.

2010–2016 
In 2010, many customers threatened to leave Zendesk in response to a substantial price increase after new features were introduced. Zendesk apologized, abandoned the pricing, and promised never to change pricing on pre-existing customers for features they already have. That same year, Zendesk created its first sales team. Zendesk moved to larger offices in the Tenderloin neighborhood of San Francisco in 2011. The city and county of San Francisco provided Zendesk with a six-year payroll tax incentive to move to the area in exchange for doing community service.

Zendesk grew internationally, and offices were established in Ireland, Denmark, and Australia. In 2017, Zendesk opened an office in Singapore.  half of Zendesk's customers were outside the United States. Although the company was not yet profitable, Zendesk's revenues grew five-fold from 2010 to 2012. Revenues grew from $38 million in 2012 to $72 million in 2013. Zendesk introduced its first app marketplace for third-party Zendesk software in 2012. By 2013, the company had 450 employees.

In 2014, Zendesk filed an initial public offering and was valued at $1.7 billion. The IPO raised $100 million. That same year, Zendesk announced its first acquisition. It bought a live-chat company called Zopim for $29.8 million. It acquired a French analytics company called BIME for $45 million. It also acquired Outbound.io, which developed software to manage direct communications with customers on social media sites. Additionally, Zendesk acquired Base, who developed sales automation software that competed with Salesforce.com, for $50 million.

In 2015, Zendesk filed oppositions at the United States Patent and Trademark Office to 49 trademarks including the word "zen". The Electronic Frontier Foundation characterized their approach of filing multiple trademark infringement lawsuits covering a wide range of businesses as trademark trolling, and EFF condemned the practice.

Initially, Zendesk's software was focused on assisting small businesses, but it transitioned to aid larger companies over time. Zendesk also transitioned from a focus on inbound customer inquiries into communicating with customers proactively based on comments they made online. In 2016, Zendesk changed its logo and rebranded to emphasize contacting customers proactively. It added features that turn online reviews and comments into a customer help ticket in September 2016 and acquired Outbound.io, which helps businesses respond to online complaints in 2017. Zendesk introduced new analytics and automation products in 2012 and 2016. In 2016, it added features that tell customer service agents which portions of the website a customer visited before contacting customer support. That same year, Zendesk added features that attempt to predict which customers are most likely to cancel their subscription service.

Recent history 
In 2017, Zendesk added an AI bot that has conversations with customers and attempts to direct the customer to the answer they're looking for. The bot initially had limited functionality, but was expanded in 2019. In 2018, the company introduced Zendesk Suite, which combines social media, live-chat, email, and other communications into a single ticket system. An enterprise version of the software-as-a-service product was released in 2018. By that time, 40 percent of Zendesk's revenue was coming from larger companies. In 2019, Zendesk first released its "Sunshine" tool, which is focused on direct-messaging customers on social media sites.

Zendesk eventually expanded from just customer service to also managing other customer interactions, such as sales. The company first moved into sales software with its September 2018 acquisition of competitor Base. Base was later renamed Sell and a Sell Marketplace was created for corresponding third-party apps. Part of the social media software acquired from Smooch was rebranded as Sunshine Conversations, a tool that competes with Salesforce.com. Zendesk's sales automation software was later revamped with Zendesk Sell in 2020, which improved integration with Zendesk's customer support software. Since then, Zendesk marketplace has integrated several third parties technologies to provide more services to the end customers. In 2021 for example, several companies joined Zendesk marketplace, such as Crowlingo for multilingual data collection, Verse for lead conversion and ViiBE for remote visual support.

By 2018, Zendesk had annual revenues of $500 million.

In October 2019, Zendesk disclosed that it was hacked in 2016, resulting in a potential leak of information about customer service agents using Zendesk.

In May 2019, Zendesk acquired Montreal-based Smooch, for an undisclosed amount. Smooch provided messaging services on websites for live-chat customer support. In 2020, Zendesk announced more tools for messaging customers on social media and enhancements to its customer relationship management features.

In October 2021, Zendesk announced that it was acquiring Momentive Global Inc., formerly SurveyMonkey, for $4.13 billion. Zendesk's investors rejected the deal on February 25, 2022 and terminated the agreement due to risk.

In June 2022, it was announced that Zendesk would be acquired by a consortium of private-equity firms led by Permira and Hellman & Friedman in an all-cash deal worth $10.2 billion. Thereafter due to the pending acquisition by these firms Zendesk neither provided shareholder's letter nor held a conference call or webcast to disclose the financial results for the third quarter ending September 30, 2022.

In September 2022, with the closure of 3rd quarter the financial results were out with a substantial increase in revenue by 20% over the year to $416.9 million and GAAP operating loss of $55.4 million with non-GAAP operating income of $48.9 million. In addition to this due to the impending transaction, Zendesk suspended it's financial guidance for the fiscal year ending December 30, 2022.

In November 2022, it was announced that the investor group had completed the acquisition of Zendesk for approximately $10.2 billion.

References

External links

2007 establishments in Denmark
2014 initial public offerings
Customer relationship management software companies
Companies based in San Francisco
Companies formerly listed on the New York Stock Exchange
Customer relationship management software
Software companies based in the San Francisco Bay Area
Software companies established in 2007
Software companies of the United States
2022 mergers and acquisitions